The Copa Republica Argentina (Japanese アルゼンチン共和国杯) is a Grade 2 handicap horse race for Thoroughbred colts and fillies aged three and over run over a distance of 2,500 metres at Tokyo Racecourse.

The race is run in November and serves as a trial race for the Japan Cup and the Arima Kinen.

It was first run in 1963 over 2300 metres. The distance was changed to 3200 metres in 1966, 2600 metres in 1969, 2500 metres in 1970 and 2400 metres in 1972. The race distance has been fixed at 2500 metres since 1981.

Among the winners of the race have been Admire Jupiter, Screen Hero, Tosen Jordan and Gold Actor.

Records
Speed record:
2:29.9 Lelouch 2012

Most successful horse (2 wins):
 Eyeful – 1976, 1977
 Minagawa Manna – 1982, 1983
 Authority – 2020, 2021

Winners since 1992

Earlier winners

 1963 – Emroan
 1964 – Toast
 1965 – Tosa Isami
 1966 – Korehide
 1967 – Riko
 1968 – Speed Symboli
 1969 – Mejiro Taito
 1970 – Matsu Sedan
 1971 – Mejiro Asama
 1972 – Zenmatsu
 1973 – Kuri Iwai
 1974 – Toyo Asami
 1975 – Kikuno O
 1976 – Eyeful
 1977 – Eyeful
 1978 – Kane Minobu
 1979 – Kane Mikasa
 1980 – Blue Max
 1981 – Western Jet
 1982 – Minagawa Manna
 1983 – Minagawa Manna
 1984 – Mejiro Seton
 1985 – Inano Lover John
 1986 – Sakura Sunny O
 1987 – Kashima Wing
 1988 – Legend Teio
 1989 – Kuri Rotary
 1990 – Mejiro Monterey
 1991 – Yamanin Global

See also
 Horse racing in Japan
 List of Japanese flat horse races

References

Turf races in Japan
1963 establishments in Japan
Recurring sporting events established in 1963